Achillea  is a genus of flowering plants in the family Asteraceae, known colloquially as yarrows. The plants typically have frilly leaves. The common name "yarrow" usually refers to A. millefolium. The genus was named after the Greek mythological character Achilles, whose soldiers were said to have used yarrow to treat their wounds; this is reflected by common names such as allheal and bloodwort. The genus is native primarily to Eurasia and North America.

Description
These plants typically have frilly, hairy, aromatic leaves. The plants show large, flat clusters of small flowers at the top of the stem. The flowers can be white, yellow, orange, pink or red and are generally visited by many insects, and are thus characterised by a generalised pollination system.

Taxonomy 
Carl Linnaeus described the genus in 1753. The common name "yarrow" is usually applied to Achillea millefolium, but may also be used for other species within the genus.

Selected species 
Nearly 1,000 names have been published within the genus Achillea, at or below the level of species. Sources differ widely as to which should be recognized as species, which merit subspecies or variety status, and which ones are merely synonyms of better-established names. For convenience, the Plant List maintained by the Kew Botanic Gardens is followed.

Cultivars 
The following cultivars are recipients of the Royal Horticultural Society's Award of Garden Merit:
Achillea ageratifolia 
Achillea 'Coronation Gold' 
Achillea 'Credo'  
Achillea filipendulina 'Cloth of Gold'  
Achillea filipendulina 'Gold Plate'  
Achillea 'Heidi'  
Achillea 'Hella Glashoff'  
Achillea 'Lachsschönheit' (Galaxy Series)  
Achillea × lewisii 'King Edward' 
Achillea 'Lucky Break'  
Achillea 'Martina' 
Achillea millefolium 'Lansdorferglut'  
Achillea 'Mondpagode' 
Achillea 'Moonshine'  
Achillea 'Summerwine'

Etymology 
The genus was named after the Greek mythological character Achilles. According to legend, Achilles' soldiers used yarrow to treat their wounds, hence some of its common names such as allheal and bloodwort.

Distribution and habitat
The genus is primarily native to Europe, temperate areas of Asia, and North America.

Ecology

Achillea species are used as food plants by the larvae of some Lepidoptera species.

Uses
Achillea species and cultivars are popular garden plants.

Gallery

References

 
Asteraceae genera
Taxa named by Carl Linnaeus